Curling was inducted at the Youth Olympic Games at the inaugural edition in 2012.

A total of 16 mixed teams (consisting of two boys and two girls) contested the mixed team tournaments in 2012 and 2016, with this being expanded to 24 teams in 2020. After the mixed team competition was finished, the mixed doubles (athletes from different countries).

Medal summary

Mixed team

Mixed doubles

Medal table
As of the 2020 Winter Youth Olympics.

Participating nations

See also
Curling at the Winter Olympics

References

 
Youth Olympics
Sports at the Winter Youth Olympics